The Little Partridge River is a river in Manitoba and Nunavut, Canada. It is in the Hudson Bay drainage basin and is a left tributary of the Buick River.

The river begins at Roosevelt Lake in the Kivalliq Region of Nunavut and travels south into Division No. 23 in Manitoba before reaching its mouth at Jonasson Lake. The lake drains via the Buick River and the Thlewiaza River to Hudson Bay.

References

Rivers of Manitoba
Rivers of Kivalliq Region
Tributaries of Hudson Bay